Filippo Corridoni (19 August 1887, in Pausula today Corridonia, Italy – 23 October 1915, in San Martino del Carso, Italy) was an Italian trade unionist and syndicalist, and the friend of future fascist dictator Benito Mussolini. Corridoni died in the First World War, hit in the head by an Austrian bullet, at Trincea delle Frasche ("trench of the branches").

1887 births
1915 deaths
Italian trade unionists
Italian syndicalists
Italian military personnel killed in World War I